Esko Jussila (born 22 April 1934) is a Finnish skier. He competed in the Nordic combined event at the 1956 Winter Olympics.

References

External links
 

1934 births
Living people
Finnish male Nordic combined skiers
Olympic Nordic combined skiers of Finland
Nordic combined skiers at the 1956 Winter Olympics
People from Hollola
Sportspeople from Päijät-Häme